Minodora Cliveti (born 24 October 1955) is a Romanian Social Democratic Party politician. In May 2012, she took her seat in the European Parliament in place of Rovana Plumb, who had resigned following her appointment as Environment Minister of Romania.

Cliveti graduated from the law faculty of Alexandru Ioan Cuza University in 1978. She practised as a lawyer in Bacău before becoming a diplomat in the Ministry of Foreign Affairs in 1996. She sat in the Chamber of Deputies of Romania from 2000 to 2008.

Footnotes

External links 
Minodora Cliveti official site 
Minodora Cliveti profile at the European Parliament

1955 births
Living people
People from Adjud
Social Democratic Party (Romania) MEPs
MEPs for Romania 2009–2014
Women MEPs for Romania
Alexandru Ioan Cuza University alumni
Members of the Chamber of Deputies (Romania)
Articles containing video clips
20th-century Romanian politicians
20th-century Romanian women politicians
21st-century Romanian politicians